Marc James Peter Laird (born 23 January 1986) is a Scottish footballer who plays as a midfielder for Scottish League Two side Stirling Albion.

Though he began his career with Manchester City in 2004, he was never used in a first team game, though he did play in loan spells at Northampton Town and Port Vale. He signed with Millwall in 2008, playing in the club's 2009–10 promotion campaign. In 2011, he played for Brentford and Walsall on loan, before moving on to Leyton Orient in summer 2011. He joined Southend United on loan in October 2012, and made a permanent move to the club in January 2013. He signed with Tranmere Rovers in July 2014, and moved on to Yeovil Town a year later. He returned to his hometown in September 2016 to sign with Edinburgh City. He spent five years with Edinburgh, before moving on to Stirling Albion in June 2021.

Career

Manchester City
Born in Edinburgh, Laird was a promising talent at Lothian Thistle Hutchison Vale, before he joined the Academy at Manchester City just before his 15th-birthday. He signed professional forms in January 2004. Laird received his first call into the senior squad for a competitive game when he was named as a substitute for a Premier League match versus Wigan Athletic on 21 October 2006. Awarded the number 39 shirt, he remained on the bench for the shock 4–0 defeat. He had brief loan spells in League One at Northampton Town in February 2007 and was called up again for the final game of the 2006–07 against Tottenham Hotspur, but did not get on the pitch. In May 2007, he was told manager Stuart Pearce had "high hopes" the young player would have "a really big year", however Pearce was sacked a few days later.

Laird was involved with the City first team during the 2007–08 pre-season, and he scored the fourth City goal in a 4–0 pre-season friendly victory against Carlstad United BK on 21 July. Things changed for Laird following the club's takeover by Thaksin Shinawatra and the appointment of Sven-Göran Eriksson as manager in July 2007. His only involvement with the first-team during the 2007–08 season came on 29 August 2007, when he was an unused substitute for a 2–1 League Cup second round victory over Bristol City. He never played a competitive game for the City first team, and was loaned to Port Vale in November/December 2007. It was at Vale Park where Laird scored his first league goal, when he netted a 25-yard strike against Walsall on Boxing Day.

Millwall
He signed with Millwall on 9 January 2008, who were managed by former Manchester City Academy coach Kenny Jackett. On 23 February 2008, Port Vale again provided Laird with yet another milestone, as he scored his second career league goal and first goal for Millwall in the 44th minute of their 3–0 home win over Vale. He played 29 games in the Lions' promotion-winning 2009–10 campaign. He was an unused substitute in the play-off final victory over Swindon Town. At the end of the season Laird agreed to sign a new one-year deal with the club. Laird signed on loan at Brentford in January 2011. He was recalled after five appearances to play for Millwall in a Championship clash with Norwich City. In March he joined Walsall on loan for the rest of the season.

Leyton Orient
Laird signed a two-year deal with Leyton Orient in July 2011; "O's" boss Russell Slade described Laird as "a good passer and a decent athlete who will add strength to our squad." He made only 11 League One starts, as Orient avoided the drop by one place and seven points. On 26 October 2012, he dropped down a division when he joined League Two side Southend United on a three-month loan. "Shrimpers" manager Paul Sturrock said that "we are lacking in the middle of the park... he's a good passer and he will add some strength and experience there." He was named in the League Two team of the week after scoring in a 3–1 win over Rochdale at Roots Hall on 26 November. After making 15 starts for Southend, he returned to Orient and was released from his contract by mutual consent on 4 January 2013.

Southend United
Having secured his release from Orient, Laird signed an 18-month contract with Southend United in January 2013. He ended the 2012–13 season with 27 appearances for Southend, though played no part in the club's run to the 2013 Football League Trophy Final.

Laird missed eight weeks at the start of the 2013–14 season after damaging his medial ligaments. He returned to action and helped the "Shrimpers" to secure a League Two play-off place at the end of the season, where they were beaten by Burton Albion at the semi-final stage. He was released by the club at the end of the season, after which manager Phil Brown commented that "Marc was a bit unlucky with his injury this season".

Tranmere Rovers
Laird signed with a one-year contract with League Two side Tranmere Rovers in July 2014. After Micky Adams was appointed as manager Laird and James Rowe shared the central midfield role with Steve Jennings in defensive midfield and Max Power in attacking midfield. He played 39 games in the 2014–15 season, as Rovers were relegated out of the English Football League.

Yeovil Town
On 19 June 2015, Laird signed for League Two side Yeovil Town on a one-year deal upon the expiry of his contract with Tranmere Rovers. He was released at the end of the 2015–16 season.

Edinburgh City
On 21 September 2016, following his release from Yeovil Town, Laird signed for Scottish League Two side Edinburgh City. Laird said he hoped the move would allow him the chance to raise his profile in Scotland. However, after picking up the division's Player of the Month award for November he decided to extend his stay at the club and signed a two-year contract extension to keep him at the Meadowbank Stadium until June 2018. This deal was then extended by a further two years in June 2017. He picked up the club's Goal of the Season award for the 2016–17 campaign for his strike in the 3–3 draw Arbroath on 1 October. He made 40 appearances over the course of the 2017–18 campaign as the "Citizens" finished in ninth-place under the stewardship of James McDonaugh, just one spot above the relegation play-offs. With just two goals in two years at Ainslie Park, Laird admitted he was disappointed in his goal tally. He added one further goal over 43 appearances in the 2018–19 season; City qualified for the play-offs but were beaten 4–0 by Clyde at the semi-final stage. He scored four goals from 31 games in the 2019–20 season, which was declared early due to the COVID-19 pandemic in Scotland, with Edinburgh second to champions Cove Rangers. He made 18 appearances in the 2020–21 campaign as Edinburgh secured a play-off place with a second-place finish, though did not play in the play-off semi-final defeat to Elgin City.

Stirling Albion
Laird signed for League Two club Stirling Albion on 9 June 2021 as manager Kevin Rutkiewicz looked to add experience to Forthbank. He was sent off after receiving two yellow cards in a 1–0 defeat to Stenhousemuir at the Forthbank Stadium on 5 March. He played 26 games in the 2021–22 campaign and was not retained in the summer by Darren Young.

Style of play
Laird is a "box to box" midfielder. Kenny Jackett, his manager at Millwall, stated that Laird had a good character and positive mindset.

Career statistics

Honours
Individual
Scottish League Two Player of the Month: November 2016

Millwall
League One play-offs: 2009–10

References

External links

1986 births
Living people
Footballers from Edinburgh
Scottish footballers
Association football midfielders
Lothian Thistle Hutchison Vale F.C. players
Manchester City F.C. players
Northampton Town F.C. players
Port Vale F.C. players
Millwall F.C. players
Brentford F.C. players
Walsall F.C. players
Leyton Orient F.C. players
Southend United F.C. players
Tranmere Rovers F.C. players
Yeovil Town F.C. players
F.C. Edinburgh players
Stirling Albion F.C. players
English Football League players
Scottish Professional Football League players